Janeene Hope Vickers-McKinney (née Vickers, born October 3, 1968) is an American former athlete who competed mainly in the 400 metres hurdles. She won bronze medals in the 400 metres hurdles at  the 1992 Olympic Games and the 1991 World Championships. She also won the 1990 US Championship.

Career
Born in Torrance, California, Vickers is a graduate of Pomona High School, where she had an outstanding high school career.  She dominated the CIF California State Meet winning both the 100 meter and 300 meter hurdles in both 1986 and 1987, adding the flat 100 meter title in 1987.   She was Track and Field News "High School Athlete of the Year" in 1987.  She continued to UCLA to  where she won three straight NCAA Championships in the 400 hurdles.

Vickers achieved her lifetime best in the 400m hurdles at the 1991 World Championships, where she won the bronze medal in 53.47 seconds, finishing behind the Soviet Union's Tatyana Ledovskaya (53.11) and Great Britain's Sally Gunnell (53.16), but ahead of her American team-mates Sandra Farmer-Patrick (53.95) and Kim Batten (53.98). This performance moved Vickers to seventh on the world all-time list and second on the US all-time list at the time. As of 2018, she ranks 14th on the US all-time list.

Vickers won an Olympic bronze medal at the 1992 Barcelona Games, running 54.31 secs to finish behind Gunnell (53.23) and Farmer-Patrick (53.69), and narrowly ahead of 1991 World champion Ledovskaya, who also clocked 54.31.

On November 4, 2011, Vickers (now Vickers-McKinney) was inducted into the UCLA Athletics Hall of Fame.

International competitions

References

External links
 
 California State Records before 2000
 

1968 births
Living people
People from Torrance, California
Track and field athletes from California
American female hurdlers
Olympic bronze medalists for the United States in track and field
Athletes (track and field) at the 1992 Summer Olympics
Medalists at the 1992 Summer Olympics
World Athletics Championships athletes for the United States
World Athletics Championships medalists
UCLA Bruins women's track and field athletes
Competitors at the 1990 Goodwill Games
World Athletics U20 Championships winners